Transylvania County Courthouse is a historic courthouse building located at Brevard, Transylvania County, North Carolina.  It was built in 1873, and is a two-story, "T"-plan Italianate style brick building with a hipped roof. It has a rear addition built in the early-20th century. The front facade features a projecting three-story tower topped by a concave mansard roof.

It was listed on the National Register of Historic Places in 1979.  It is located in the Main Street Historic District.

References

County courthouses in North Carolina
Courthouses on the National Register of Historic Places in North Carolina
Italianate architecture in North Carolina
Government buildings completed in 1873
Buildings and structures in Transylvania County, North Carolina
National Register of Historic Places in Transylvania County, North Carolina
Historic district contributing properties in North Carolina